Donald Close ( – ) was a  professional rugby league footballer who played as a  in the 1950s and 1960s. 

He played at representative level for Great Britain and Yorkshire, and at club level for Allerton Bywater ARLFC (in Allerton Bywater, Leeds), and Huddersfield during the era of contested scrums.

Background
Don Close worked as a coal miner.

Playing career

International honours
Don Close won a cap for Great Britain while at Huddersfield in 1967 against France.

County honours
Don Close won cap(s) for Yorkshire  while at Huddersfield.

Challenge Cup Final appearances
Don Close played  in Huddersfield's 6-12 defeat by Wakefield Trinity in the 1961–62 Challenge Cup Final during the 1961–62 season at Wembley Stadium, London on Saturday 12 May 1962, in front of a crowd of 81,263.

County Cup Final appearances
Don Close played  in Huddersfield's 10-16 defeat by Wakefield Trinity in the 1960–61 Yorkshire County Cup Final during the 1960–61 season at Headingley Rugby Stadium, Leeds on Saturday, 29 October 1960.

Testimonial match
Don Close's Testimonial match at Huddersfield took place in 1968.

References

External links
!Great Britain Statistics at englandrl.co.uk (statistics currently missing due to not having appeared for both Great Britain, and England)
Search for "Don Close" at britishnewspaperarchive.co.uk

1930s births
1990s deaths
Great Britain national rugby league team players
Huddersfield Giants players
Place of birth missing
Rugby league hookers
Year of birth missing
Yorkshire rugby league team players